Jess Pryles is an Australian chef, television show host of Aussie Barbecue Heroes, meat expert and a live fire cook. She co-founded the Australasian Barbecue Alliance. She is also the author of the book Hardcore Carnivore. She now lives in Austin, Texas.

Career

Early career
Pryles earned a degree in Communications before starting a blog called Burger Mary. The blog led to a website which focused on her own recipes. Pryles then toured Texas visiting butchers and ranchers, before co-founding the Australasian Barbecue Alliance.She moved to Texas in 2015. She works as a spokesperson for Gerber Knives and Kingsford Charcoal and she promotes her own cookbook and her products: a line of Hardcore Carnivore meat rubs. In 2018 she was named a spokesperson for Lone Star Beer. In addition to slow cooked barbecue, and smoked meats, Pryles is considered an expert in live fire cooking. She also teaches workshops in how to cook meat with live fire.

Television
Pryles is one of the hosts of the television show Aussie Barbecue Heroes which is an Australian reality competition television series on the Seven Network. The series features nine teams competing in a series of barbecue cooking challenges for 100,000 worth of prizes. Other hosts on the show include chef Ben O'Donoghue, and former My Kitchen Rules contestant Robert Murphy.

She has also been featured on "Beat Bobby Flay" as a judge, and "The Today Show" and "SEC Nation" as a special guest.

Books
Hardcore Carnivore

See also
 Barbecue
 Smoked meat

References

External links
Jess Pryles

1966 births
Living people
Cookbook writers
21st-century American women writers
Women food writers
Women chefs
Australian television personalities
Women television personalities
People from Melbourne, Australia
People from Austin, Texas